The group stage of the 2001 CAF Champions League was played from 11 August to 21 October 2001. A total of eight teams competed in the group stage and for the first time, the group winners and runners-up advance to the Knockout stage playing semifinal rounds before the final.

Format
In the group stage, each group was played on a home-and-away round-robin basis. The winners and the runners-up of each group advanced to the Knockout stage.

Groups

Group A

Group B

References

External links
2001 CAF Champions League - todor66.com

Group stage